Spindle Piece is a bronze sculpture series by Henry Moore.  Unusually, the sculpture was made in four sizes: a plaster maquette cast in bronze as Maquette for Spindle Piece (LH 591) in 1968, a larger plaster working model which was also cast in bronze as Spindle Piece (LH 592) in 1968, a larger series of bronze sculptures Large Spindle Piece (LH 593) cast in 1974, and the largest model, known as The Spindle (LH 593a), carved in travertine in 1981.

Background
The work is part of Moore's Spindle series of sculptures, which was exhibited in Hyde Park in London in 1968.  The series was inspired by a detail of Michelangelo's painting on the ceiling of the Sistine Chapel, where God's hand reaches towards Adam's finger.  The sculpture is an amorphous twisting flowing form, pierced by a hole, with a point bursting out from each side.  The opposite points suggest the possibility of rotating the convoluted work.  Moore said, "Sculpturally, [Michelangelo's painting is] two points just about to meet. This work is on the same theme, only the two fingers are going out, not in."

Moore also drew inspiration from a piece of flint, cast by Moore in clay, and drawings from 1938; and the work is related to his 1939 work Three Points (LH 211): Moore said, "Here again the points are used to give action: inwards in the case of the Three Points, but here to give action outwards." Another sculpture with a similar theme but with inward-facing points is his Oval with Points (LH 596).

Maquette
An example is in the Metropolitan Museum of Art in New York.

Spindle Piece

One in private hands was sold at Sotheby's in February 2013 for £301,250.

Large Spindle Piece

The Large Spindle Piece casts are displayed at:
 The science quadrangle at Kenyon College in Gambier, Ohio
 Eleanor Tinsley Park in Buffalo Bayou Park in Houston, Texas (originally sited at Tranquility Park, Houston) (cast 4/6) 
 Corniche Road in Jeddah, Saudi Arabia
 Hakone Open-Air Museum in Hakone Japan
 Miyagi Museum of Art in Sendai, Japan
 North Carolina Museum of Art in Raleigh, North Carolina
 
 the sculptor's model (cast 0/6) which was displayed at the British Council in Spring Gardens near Trafalgar Square in London from 1981 to 1996; after a period at the Henry Moore Foundation in Perry Green, Hertfordshire, and at the Yorkshire Sculpture Park, it has been loaned to Network Rail to stand outside King's Cross station in London.

The stone sculpture was dropped in Italy and required extensive repair before it was shipped to the US to become the centrepiece of a fountain in the lobby of the InterContinental Miami which was built around the monumental sculpture. It is the largest sculpture by Moore in private ownership.

See also
List of sculptures by Henry Moore

References

 Celebrating Moore: Works from the Collection of the Henry Moore Foundation, edited by David Mitchinson, Henry Moore Foundation, pp. 292–93

Sculptures by Henry Moore
1965 sculptures
Bronze sculptures in the United Kingdom